Lieutenant-Colonel James Achilles Kirkpatrick (1764 – 15 October 1805) was an East India Company officer and diplomat who served as the Resident at Hyderabad Deccan from 1798 until 1805. Kirkpatrick also ordered the construction of the Koti Residency in Hyderabad, which has since come to serve as a major tourist attraction.

Biography
James Achilles Kirkpatrick was born in 1764 at Fort St George, Madras. He replaced his brother William and arrived in Hyderabad in 1795 to assume the position of Resident, which had previously been held by his brother. During his initial few months in Hyderabad, James became enamoured with the Indo-Persian culture at the Nizam of Hyderabad's court, and substituted his European dress for Persian attire.

Although a colonel in the Presidency armies, Kirkpatrick wore Mughal-style clothing at home, smoked a hookah, chewed betelnut, enjoyed nautch parties, and maintained a small harem in his zenanakhana. Born in India, Kirkpatrick was educated in Britain, spoke Tamil as his first language, wrote poetry in Urdu, and added Persian and Hindustani to his "linguistic armoury".

With fluency in Hindustani and Persian, he openly mingled with the social elite of Hyderabad. Kirkpatrick was adopted by the Nizam of Hyderabad, who invested him with many titles: mutamin ul mulk ('Safeguard of the kingdom'), hushmat jung ('Valiant in battle'), nawab fakhr-ud-dowlah bahadur ('Governor, pride of the state, and hero').

During the reign of King George III, Kirkpatrick's hookah-bardar (hookah servant/preparer) was said to have robbed and cheated Kirkpatrick, making his way to England and stylising himself as the Prince of Sylhet. The man was waited upon by the Prime Minister William Pitt the Younger, and then dined with the Duke of York before presenting himself in front of the King.

Marriage
In 1800, after falling in love with a local Hyderabadi Sayyida noblewoman called Khair-un-Nissa, Kirkpatrick not only married her, according to Muslim law, and "adopted Mughal clothes" and ways of living, but had actually "converted to Islam" and had become a double agent working against the East India Company and for the Hyderabadis.

Kirkpatrick had an extremely private, Muslim marriage ceremony in which he wed Khair-un-Nissa, who was fourteen years old, not an unusual age for the marriage of girl of her social class.  She was the granddaughter of Nawab Mahmood Ali Khan, the prime minister of Hyderabad. However, the marriage was not recorded and does not appear to  have been legally valid; in his will he described the offspring of the relationship as his "natural" children, a polite euphemism for illegitimate children that a father recognized as his own offspring.  In his will, Kirkpatrick emphasized his devotion to Khair-un-Nissa, stipulating that he left her only a token bequest in light of the fact that in addition to her jewels, she possessed a large, landed fortune inherited from her father, leaving large fortunes to their two children instead. Before their father's unexpected, early death, at ages 3 and 5, the children had been sent to be reared by Kirkpatrick's relatives in England, as was usual among the British families in India in that period.

"Hashmat Jang was believed by some of his Muslim staff and by the bride's female relations to secretly embraced Islam before a Shi'a Mujtahid (cleric); he is said to have presented a certificate from him to Khair-un-Nissa Begum, who sent it to her mother." Towards the end of autumn of 1801, a major scandal broke out in Calcutta over Kirkpatrick's behaviour at the Hyderabad court. A scandal arose due to the ethnically and racially mixed nature of the marriage.

The conditions under which Kirkpatrick operated as Resident were affected by  Lord Richard Wellesley’s appointment as Governor-General of India. Wellesley favored taking a assertive diplomatic stance with the Nizam, which included reducing the amount of autonomy he wielded. In addition, Wellesley strongly disapproved of Kirkpatrick's marriage to Khair-un-Nissa.

After Kirkpatrick died in Calcutta on 15 October 1805, Khair-un-Nissa, who was only 19 years old, had a brief love affair with Kirkpatrick's assistant, Henry Russell, who would become the Resident in Hyderabad in 1810. After what Russell appears to have regarded as a brief fling, he abandoned Khair-un-Nissa who, with her reputation now ruined, was unable to prevent greedy relatives from taking over the valuable landed estates she had inherited from her father. Russell married a half-Portuguese woman. Although she, as a disgraced woman consequent to the love affair with Russell, was not allowed by her family to return to Hyderabad for some years, after the death of a senior male relative she was eventually allowed to return, and died in Hyderabad on 22 September 1813 aged 27.

Kirkpatrick and Khair-un-Nissa together had two children: a son, Mir Ghulam Ali Sahib Allum and a daughter, Noor-un-Nissa Sahib Begum. Their father had sent them to England to live with their grandfather Colonel James Kirkpatrick, in London and Keston, Kent, shortly before his own, unexpected death at a young age. The two children were baptised on 25 March 1805 at St. Mary’s Church, Marylebone Road, and were thereafter known by their new Christian names, William George Kirkpatrick and Katherine Aurora "Kitty" Kirkpatrick. William was disabled in 1812 after falling into a copper of boiling water and had to have an arm amputated; he married and had three children but died in 1828 aged 27. Kitty was for a few years the love interest of the Scottish writer and philosopher Thomas Carlyle, then a young man of no fortune working as a tutor and an ineligible match for an heiress.  She married Captain James Winslowe Phillipps and they had seven children. She died in Torquay, Devon, in 1889.

Popular culture
A large part of White Mughals, a book by the historian William Dalrymple, concerns Kirkpatrick's relationship with Khair-un-Nissa.

Citations

References

External links
James Achilles Kirkpatrick's Memorial at St. John's Church, Calcutta (Kolkata) 

1764 births
1805 deaths
Administrators in British India
British East India Company people
British East India Company Army officers
British Muslims
Indian Muslims